is a retired Japanese judoka.

Suzuki was born in Fujimi, Saitama, and began judo in earnest at the age of a 5th grader. She entered the Saitama University after graduating from high-school.

She was counted as a top in Japan by the proud skill, Seoinage and Newaza. In 1993, she participated World Championships held in Hamilton, Ontario but defeated by Almudena Muñoz at semi-final and won a bronze medal. She was also expected to get medal of Olympic Games in 1996 but retired in 1995 due to Overtraining.

As of 2010, Suzuki coaches judo at Shukutoku University and among her students is former Asian champion Sae Nakazawa.

Achievements
1985 - All-Japan Selected Championships (-48 kg) 3rd
1986 - Fukuoka International Women's Championships (-48 kg) 3rd
 - All-Japan Selected Championships (-48 kg) 2nd
1987 - Fukuoka International Women's Championships (-48 kg) 2nd
 - Pacific Rim Championships (-48 kg) 1st
 - All-Japan Selected Championships (-48 kg) 2nd
1988 - All-Japan High School Championships (-48 kg) 1st
1989 - Fukuoka International Women's Championships (-48 kg) 3rd
 - All-Japan Selected Championships (-48 kg) 3rd
 - All-Japan University Championships (-48 kg) 2nd
1990 - All-Japan Selected Championships (-48 kg) 3rd
1991 - All-Japan University Championships (-52 kg) 3rd
1992 - All-Japan University Championships (-52 kg) 2nd
1993 - World Championships (-52 kg) 3rd
 - All-Japan Selected Championships (-48 kg) 1st

References

Japanese female judoka
Sportspeople from Saitama Prefecture
1970 births
Living people
20th-century Japanese women